Rita is an unincorporated community in Burleson County, Texas, United States. According to the Handbook of Texas, the community had a population of 50 in 2000. It is located within the Bryan-College Station metropolitan area.

History 
Rita was founded on Teal Prairie, two miles west of Fort Tenoxtitlan, in the late 1800s. It is on the land grant bought by John Teal, an Army of the Republic of Texas veteran. A post office was established at Rita in 1894 and remained in operation until 1905. Oil was soon discovered here at the start of the 20th century. The American Red Cross organized a chapter in the community during World War I. There were 20 residents and one business in Rita in 1939. It then grew to 50 from 1968 through 2000.

Geography
Rita is located on the south bank of Dam Creek, about two miles west of the Brazos River in the blackland prairie of the fertile Brazos bottoms in northeastern Burleson County.

Education 
Today, Rita is served by the Caldwell Independent School District.

References

Unincorporated communities in Burleson County, Texas
Unincorporated communities in Texas
Bryan–College Station